The Laurentian Pilotage Authority is a Crown corporation of the Government of Canada, which was established as a result of recommendations made by the Royal Commission on Pilotage in Canada, by the Pilotage Act in February 1972. The corporation is responsible for pilotage through Canadian waters in Quebec north of the Saint-Lambert Lock, excluding Chaleur Bay south of Cap d'Espoir.

References 

Federal departments and agencies of Canada
Canadian federal Crown corporations
Companies based in Montreal
Transport companies established in 1972
Water transport in Quebec
1972 establishments in Quebec